Moon Man is a 2012 German-French-Irish animated film directed by Stephan Schesch based on the 1966 novel of the same name by Tomi Ungerer.

Premise 
The man on the moon gets bored and visits Earth.

Release 
The film had its world premiere at the Annecy International Animation Film Festival in France on 8 June 2012, and its German premiere on 28 June 2012 at the Five Lakes Film Festival in Fünfseenland. The film had its theatrical release in Germany on 14 March 2013. It had a worldwide gross of $131,705.

Reception 
On review aggregator Rotten Tomatoes, the film holds an approval rating of 86% based on 22 critical reviews. The critics consensus reads: "Its deliberate pacing is certainly an acquired taste, but Moon Man's enchanting animation style and subversive flourishes make it a refreshingly off-beat yarn."

References

External links 

Moon Man at filmportal.de (in German)

2012 animated films
2010s French animated films
2010s German animated films
Irish animated films